The Inland Empire Ravens is an expansion team of the Women's Football Alliance that began play in 2012.  Based in Riverside, California, the Ravens plans to announce its home venue in the coming weeks.

Season-By-Season

|-
|2017* ||  ||  ||  ||  || --

* = current standing

2017

Season schedule

External links 

Women's Football Alliance teams
Sports in Riverside, California
American football teams in California
American football teams established in 2012
Women's sports in California